Eucereon aoris is a moth of the subfamily Arctiinae. It was described by Heinrich Benno Möschler in 1878. It is found in Suriname.

References

aoris
Moths described in 1878